ARTADE (ARabidopsis Tiling Array-based Detection of Exons) is a database for the annotation of genome-wide tiling-array data in Arabidopsis

See also
 DNA microarray

References

External links
 https://web.archive.org/web/20110722123507/https://web.archive.org/web/20110722123507/http%3A//omicspace.riken.jp/ARTADE/

Biological databases
Gene expression
Microarrays